Sir Hugh Ian Lang Laddie (15 April 1946 – 28 November 2008) was a judge of the High Court of England and Wales. He was a leader in the field of intellectual property law. He was co-author of the Modern Law of Copyright (1980).

Laddie was educated at Aldenham School and St Catharine's College, Cambridge. He studied medicine but changed to law. He became a barrister in 1969. He is credited with having developed the idea of applying for an Anton Piller order while still a junior. After 25 years at the bar, he was appointed a High Court judge in April 1995, and was assigned to the Chancery Division, as one of the Patents Court judges.

He resigned from his post as a judge in 2005, "because he found it boring" and felt isolated on the bench. He became a consultant for Willoughby & Partners, a boutique law firm, UK legal arm of Rouse & Co International, a move which was criticised by some. He was thought to be the first High Court judge to resign voluntarily in 35 years,  and the first subsequently to join a firm of solicitors. No one since Sir Henry Fisher, in 1970, had resigned from the bench.

He was appointed to a Chair in Intellectual Property Law at University College London, with effect from 1 September 2006. He founded there the Institute of Brand and Innovation Law. The Sir Hugh Laddie chair in Intellectual Property has subsequently been established at UCL.

Personal life
Hugh Laddie married Stecia Zamet in 1970. He died of cancer on 28 November 2008, aged 62.

References

External links
 Sir Hugh Laddie bio at University College London website
 IPKat, Obituary of Sir Hugh Laddie, 30 November 2008
 William Patry, In Memoriam Sir Hugh Laddie, The Patry Copyright Blog, 30 November 2008.
 Obituary in The Guardian, 2 December 2008
 Obituary in The Daily Telegraph, 3 December 2008
 Obituary in The Times, 5 December 2008

1946 births
2008 deaths
Academics of University College London
Alumni of St Catharine's College, Cambridge
Deaths from cancer in England
English barristers
21st-century English judges
Knights Bachelor
People educated at Aldenham School
Chancery Division judges
Lawyers from London
20th-century English judges